William Wright (1782-??) was a Scottish poet.

Born in the Row, Ednam, he was largely paralysed from birth.

He was particularly keen on nature poetry, and spent long hours in Ednam kirkyard penning his poems, which include,"To a Robin Redbreast", "To a Thrush" and "To a Wild Flower". He also wrote about events of his time, such as the Napoleonic wars.

The date of his death is uncertain. It would have probably been around the mid-19th century.

1782 births
Scottish poets
Year of death missing
People from the Scottish Borders
19th-century Scottish people